Simon Ekpa (born 21 March 1985) is a Nigerian-Finnish lawyer, political activist and former athlete. Ekpa is alleged to have incited violence in southeastern Nigeria.

Life 
Ekpa was born on 21 March 1985 in Ohaukwu local government area of Ebonyi State. Prior to his activism, he won a silver medal for Nigeria in 100 meters in the 2003 African Junior Athletics Championships in Cameroon. Ekpa has lived in Lahti, Finland since 2007. He is a member of the National Coalition Party of Finland, and was a candidate in the 2022 Finnish county elections.

According to reporting by Yle, Simon Ekpa's activism started to gather mainstream attention in February 2023. Finland, with calls to investigate his activities and to determine if his alleged incitement fills the legal definitions for incitement against ethnic groups. The local Kokoomus parti in Lahti stated that they have started an internal investigation of these claims. Orji Anya Odim, representing the association Igbo Union Finland, stated in the same interview, "He should stop inciting hatred and provoking. Ekpa does not represent the Igbo people of Finland". The Nigerian government has also demanded Finland stop Ekpa's activities. Many live in fear in Nigeria of Ekpa. Yle travelled to Enugu to interview locals. When Ekpa has issued "stay at home" orders involving the coming Nigerian election, many in Enugu seem to heed this. Some, however, said they would go despite the stay at home orders. In late February 2023 Yle reported Ekpa is being suspected of having raised funds in an illegal manner, by the Keskusrikospoliisi.

Career 
Ekpa is a Nigerian Finnish-based lawyer. He rose to prominence when he was made lead broadcaster for Radio Biafra, associated with the separatist organisation Indigenous People of Biafra (IPOB) after the arrest of political activist Nnamdi Kanu. After some weeks, he was sacked as the lead broadcaster citing violation of the rules of the organisation.

References 

1985 births
People from Biafra
Living people
Nigerian activists
Nigerian male sprinters
Nigerian expatriates in Finland
National Coalition Party politicians
People from Ebonyi State